James Sheppard (16 January 1888 – 10 December 1944) was an Australian cricketer. He played in twenty first-class matches for Queensland between 1912 and 1924.

Cricket career
Sheppard played for Toombul in Brisbane Grade Cricket at district level scoring 5583 runs at an average of 23.45 in 180 matches and earning a reputation as being particularly strong scoring runs behind the wicket and he was also described as a brilliant slip fieldsman. He began playing for Queensland at state level in 1912 and in 1920 he captained Queensland in a match against the Australian Imperial Force XI.

See also
 List of Queensland first-class cricketers

References

External links
 

1888 births
1944 deaths
Australian cricketers
Queensland cricketers
Cricketers from Brisbane